Angelo Siniscalchi (born 15 July 1984) is an Italian footballer who plays for Serie D club AC Rezzato.

Biography
Born in Salerno, Campania, Siniscalchi started his career at hometown club Salernitana. Siniscalchi made his league debut on 31 May 2005, along with Gianmarco Rodio replaced Agostino Garofalo and Luca Fusco respectively. Salernitana certainly finished as the bottom but later re-admitted to Serie B 2003–04 due to Caso Catania. In 2004–05 season, he left for Serie C2 club Bellaria

After Salernitana Sport went bankrupt and re-admitted to Serie C1 as Salernitana Calcio 1919 in 2005, Siniscalchi re-joined the new team in the Italian third division. He played for Salernitana in Serie C1 seasons.

In July 2007, he left for Serie B side Ascoli in co-ownership deal. Ascoli relegated from Serie A just 2 months earlier. However, Siniscalchi failed to become a regular starter partially due to injury. He left for Lega Pro Prima Divisione side Pescara on 1 September 2008. In June 2009, Ascoli and Salernitana failed to agree a price for the remain 50% registration rights, and Ascoli won the closed tender as the club submitted a higher bid against Salernitana to Lega Calcio. On 27 August 2009, he was loaned to Prima Divisione side PortoSummaga, where he won promotion to Serie B.

In July 2010, he was sold to Prima Divisione side Benevento in co-ownership deal, signed a 3-year contract. He started the first 5 matches so far with the Campania side, including the two 2010–11 Coppa Italia matches.

On 24 July 2013 he moved to Lega Pro Prima Divisione club Salernitana.

On 25 July 2015 Siniscalchi joined A.C. Pavia.

Honours
Lega Pro Prima Divisione: 2010

References

External links
 La Gazzetta dello Sport Profile 
 Football.it Profile 
 
 Angelo Siniscalchi at Tuttocalciatori

Italian footballers
Serie B players
U.S. Salernitana 1919 players
A.C. Bellaria Igea Marina players
Ascoli Calcio 1898 F.C. players
Delfino Pescara 1936 players
A.S.D. Portogruaro players
Benevento Calcio players
Association football central defenders
People from Salerno
1984 births
Living people
Sportspeople from the Province of Salerno
Footballers from Campania